Katherine Bradford (born 1942), née Houston, is an American artist based in New York City, known for figurative paintings, particularly of swimmers, that critics describe as simultaneously representational, abstract and metaphorical. She began her art career relatively late and has received her widest recognition in her seventies. Critic John Yau characterizes her work as independent of canon or genre dictates, open-ended in terms of process, and quirky in its humor and interior logic.

Bradford has exhibited internationally, at venues including MoMA PS1, Campoli Presti (London and Paris), Modern Art Museum of Fort Worth, Brooklyn Museum, Crystal Bridges Museum, and Tomio Koyama (Tokyo). She has received awards from the John Simon Guggenheim, Joan Mitchell and Pollock-Krasner foundations and the American Academy of Arts and Letters. Her work belongs to public art collections including the Metropolitan Museum of Art, Brooklyn Museum, Dallas Museum of Art, Institute of Contemporary Art, Boston, and Menil Collection, among others.

Bradford lives with her spouse Jane O'Wyatt, in New York City and Brunswick, Maine, and works out of a studio in Williamsburg, Brooklyn.

Early life and career
Bradford was born in 1942 in New York City and grew up in Connecticut. When she was a child, her mother discouraged the "bohemian" life of the arts, despite Bradford's grandfather, Jacques André Fouilhoux, being a prominent architect. After earning a BA at Bryn Mawr College, Bradford followed a conventional (1960s) path, marrying Peter A. Bradford and raising twins born in 1969; her children are writer and filmmaker Arthur Bradford and Laura Bradford, who is a lawyer and law professor. When the family moved to Maine in the early 1970s, she joined an art community there that included Lois Dodd and Yvonne Jacquette, among others. Without training, she began creating abstract work concerned with markmaking, the materiality of paint, and the landscape tradition. She also co-founded the Union of Maine Visual Artists (1975) and wrote art reviews for The Maine Times.

In 1979, despite disapproval from her family, Bradford moved to New York City as a single mother to pursue art in closer contact with contemporary painting discourse. She enrolled in graduate studies at SUNY Purchase (MFA, 1987) and met her future spouse, Jane O'Wyatt, in 1990. In the subsequent decade, she had solo exhibitions at the Victoria Munroe (New York), Zolla/Lieberman (Chicago), and Bernard Toale (Boston) galleries, and appeared in group shows at the Portland Museum of Art, Weatherspoon Art Museum and The Drawing Center. In the 2000s, Bradford has exhibited at the CANADA, Sperone Westwater and Pace galleries in New York, the Modern Art Museum of Fort Worth, Galerie Haverkampf (Berlin), Campoli Presti, Kaufman Repetto (Milan), and the New Orleans Biennial (Prospect.4, 2017), among others.

In addition to artmaking, Bradford taught at Illinois State University, Ohio State University and SUNY Purchase, before joining the faculties at Fashion Institute of Technology (FIT) (1995–2011) and Pennsylvania Academy of Fine Arts (1997–2012). She later taught at the Skowhegan School of Painting and Sculpture (2009) and Yale School of Art (2016–7).

Work
Bradford is best known for direct, casual, color-saturated paintings of swimmers, boats, and caped flying figures that are noted for their paint handling, rich color-field surfaces, theatrical sense of light, and oblique themes and narratives. Critics suggest that she weights color, iconography and narrative equally in her work, privileging exploration and formal and metaphorical possibility over conclusiveness.

Art in America'''s Robert Berlind characterizes her method as "predicated on a trust in possibilities beyond her conscious intentions or formal inclinations, and on a responsiveness to what shows up on the canvas." Bradford has said that she does not begin with a plan, but rather draws on her ongoing vocabulary of forms, discovering each image through the painting process and intuition.Vogel, Maria. "Katherine Bradford Embraces an Unconstrained Practice," Art of Choice, May 30, 2019. Retrieved April 6, 2020. Artcritical editor David Cohen writes that she combines "the peculiar poetic charm and nonchalance of provisional painting with the energy, seriousness, and resolve of classic abstract painting"; he compares her formal evolution to Philip Guston's ("high-abstraction-to-low-realism") but differentiates her treatment of subjects as romantic, heartfelt, and whimsical.

Early painting
Bradford's early, modestly scaled paintings were largely abstract, employing irregular grids and rows of pictographic dots, spirals and crude letterforms set against vaporous surfaces akin to the meditative work of Mark Rothko.Smith, Roberta. "Katherine Bradford," The New York Times, October 27, 1989, p. C30. Retrieved April 2, 2020. Art in America's Stephen Westfall wrote that the paintings charted "a laconic course between abstraction, representation and collage," while New York Times critic Roberta Smith described their schematization of nature as "small, ruggedly made abstractions that are at once poetic and humorous." Eileen Myles situated Bradford among a group of mainly female artists "reconstituting painting" through "wit, subversion and bad geometry." In her late 1990s work, Bradford moved closer to iconographic representation, depicting box forms and figures with bold, heavy lines and a comedic or darkly humorous tone.Lombardi, Dominick D. "Inaugural exhibition for Gallery in Beacon," The New York Times, April 22, 2001, p. WC14. Retrieved April 2, 2020.

Mid-career painting: ships and boats
Bradford received wider attention with work in the 2000s centered on marine imagery: ethereal ocean liners, sailboats, sea battles, and other-worldly aliens or vulnerable figures that suggested spiritual or intellectual illumination emerging out of darkness (e.g., Lake Sisters, 2004, Traveler, 2004 and Hydra Head, 2006).Kalm, James. "Katherine Bradford, Sarah Bowen Gallery," The Brooklyn Rail, February 2005. Retrieved April 6, 2020.Fyfe, Joe. "Katherine Bradford at Sarah Bowen," Art in America, May 2005. Critics characterize these paintings as both mysterious and direct, with simple, ambiguously scaled and combined elements, fluid sea-sky realms, and surfaces of abraded brushstrokes, dabs and scumbling that evoke rather define form. James Kalm describes them as combining "New England romantic realism with transparent fields of zippy new age color and subversive figuration," unified by unfussy, direct brushwork.

John Yau identified paintings in Bradford's 2007 show (Edward Thorp), such as Desire for Transport—a flotilla of seven boats floats carrying mysterious gowned figures on a blue-green sea—as "breakthrough" works for Bradford that synthesized "the bluntness of primitive painting, the directness of gestural mark-making [and] the gamut of expressionism" to create a sense of expectancy; New York Times critic Ken Johnson wrote that the painted ships suggest "utopian collectivity, promising voyages of kindred spirits to unknown shores."

Critics observe that Bradford's later marine paintings move further from representational picture-space toward more open-ended, abstract "painting-space." In this work, unearthly lit, foreshortened, monolithic ships read equally as abstract, irregular trapezoids alluding to Minimalist sculpture, set against grounds that function as moody color fields and slabs of pure color (e.g., Titanic Orange Sea and Sargasso, both 2012).

 Superman paintings 

In the early 2010s, Bradford began painting plunging figures and idiosyncratic, caped "Superman" characters, set against soft color fields or atmospheric matte skies marked with star bursts and zigzags suggesting paths (e.g., Superman Responds, Night, 2011). Her superhero images are described variously as "luminous and sumptuously tactile," goofy, frumpy, vulnerable, and caught in a tentative state between flying and diving. Robert Berlind characterized their style as "at once offhand and emblematic"; David Cohen wrote that Superman Responds (2011) conveys "a convincing if gender-bent voluptuousness" in a few carefree-seeming dabs with "disconcerting observational acumen" and anatomical precision.

Writers differentiate the Superman paintings from Pop, cartoon or ironic work in both appearance and attitude, noting their qualities of warmth, vulnerability,  reverie and metaphorical openness. John Yau identifies them as knowing meditations on heroism, history and masculinity as "simultaneously powerful and impotent, idiotic and funny."Kimball, Whitney. "Four Shows NYC, Aggro Crag at BOSI Contemporary," New American Paintings, September 21, 2012. Retrieved April 6, 2020. Other writers, however, suggest they represent new symbols of strength in vulnerability, visionary individualism, personal exploration, and perhaps, Bradford herself.

Later painting: swimmers and figurative works
Bradford's later work (e.g., her "Fear of Waves" exhibition, 2016) has evolved toward larger, more vibrant work, that Yau writes "transform[s] the whimsical into the catastrophic, its polar opposite, without losing [its] offhand humor."Butler, Sharon. "Starry Night: Katherine Bradford at Canada," Two Coats of Paint, January 20, 2016. Retrieved April 2, 2020. Often painted in water-soluble acrylic—ideal for mimicking the effects of water in images of swimmers, bathers and surfers—these paintings take more formal risks, with complex compositions of multiple figures and divided grounds of otherworldly, nocturnal planetary-oceanic environments.

In the near-monochrome painting Blue Swimmers (2015), Bradford submerges and crops ghostly, awkwardly human figures within washes of blue or green, complicating figure-ground relationships while alluding to themes of birth, life, and possibly, death.Hirsch, Faye. "Katherine Bradford," Art in America, April 2016. Retrieved April 6, 2020.Pardee, Hearne. "Katherine Bradford, Fear of Waves," The Brooklyn Rail, February 3, 2016. Retrieved April 6, 2020. Other paintings, like the diagonally divided, vertical Fear of Waves (2016), introduce an element of uncertainty or calamity whose specific threat and outcome remains a mystery; the bird's-eye view work depicts a crowd of swimmers fleeing giant, leftward-moving waves toward through a turquoise impasto, conveying a sense of insignificance against the unfathomable.

Critics such as Lilly Wei identify Bradford's "Friends and Strangers" (2018), "Legs and Stripes" (2019) and "Mother Paintings" (2021) exhibitions as departures in terms of palette, process and collective themes, such as race, sexuality, gender and identity.Ludel, Wallace and Gabriella Angeleti.  "Three exhibitions to see in New York this weekend," The Art Newspaper, April 29, 2021. Retrieved February 25, 2022. The former shows were characterized by vibrant pinks, magentas, purples and yellows, directly drawn thick outline, monumental scale, and the use of gesture and facial direction rather than expression to convey emotion.Campoli Presti. "Katherine Bradford," Retrieved April 13, 2020. In paintings such as Olympiad (2018), she experimented with colors mixed with fluorescent magenta paint and improbable arrangements of figures that balanced interests in how subjects fit together as abstract compositional elements and as potential social communities. Works such as Choice of Heads (2019) and Couple No Shirts (2018) explored identity; in the latter, an androgynous, economically drawn couple serves to both imply universality and examine assumptions involving categorization and looking.

Later painting: Mother Paintings

In 2021, Bradford had major shows at Canada ("Mother Paintings"), the Carpenter Center for the Visual Arts, and the Hall Art Foundation. In the Canada show, she exhibited more moody, figurative paintings depicting varying degrees of familial intimacy and maternal feeling.Kamp, Justin. "Katherine Bradford Tackles Motherhood With ‘Mother Paintings’ at Canada Gallery," Observer, May 10, 2021. Retrieved February 25, 2022. Critics considered these paintings a further step in a narrative trajectory toward interpersonal relationships—and for the first time—outside events, in this case, the COVID-19 pandemic.Hunter, Lucy. "Katherine Bradford," The Guide.Art, April 2021. Retrieved February 25, 2022. Her figures remained ambiguous—somewhat crudely drawn in contour lines against monochromatic Rothko-like grounds—but dominate their frames more, connecting through spare gestures and contact that suggested lifetimes of affection and a heroic sense of care (e.g., Fever, Motherhood, and Mother's Lap).

Awards, commissions and collections
Bradford has been recognized with a Guggenheim Fellowship (2011), a Rappaport Foundation Prize for New England artists,<ref name="AFD21">ArtfixDaily. "DeCordova Sculpture Park and Museum Awards 22nd Rappaport Prize to Artist Katherine Bradford," August 23, 2021. Retrieved February 15, 2022.</ref> and awards from the Joan Mitchell Foundation (2012), American Academy of Arts and Letters (2011, 2005), and Pollock-Krasner Foundation (2000). In 2021, MTA Arts & Design commissioned Bradford to make glass mosaic murals for the First Avenue station of the New York City Subway's . They include three large works collectively titled Queens of the Night—which depict figures in dancelike poses against a sapphire blue background—and two smaller works of flying superheroes, titled Superhero Responds.

Bradford's work belongs to the public collections of the Metropolitan Museum of Art, Brooklyn Museum, Dallas Museum of Art, Menil Collection, Portland Art Museum, Addison Gallery of American Art, Hall Art Foundation, ICA Boston, Pennsylvania Academy of the Fine Arts, Portland Museum of Art (Maine), Tang Museum, and several college museums, among others.

References

External links
Runaway Woman feature by Lights Out Gallery 
Katherine Bradford Guggenheim Fellowship page
Katherine Bradford Speaks with Nancy Princenthal, April 2021
Kathleen Bradford with Jason Stopa, Interview, The Brooklyn Rail
Interview with Katherine Bradford, Jennifer Samet, Hyperallergic
Katherine Bradford "Friends and Strangers" at Canada, video, James Kalm, 2018
Katherine Bradford "Fear of Waves" at Canada, video, James Kalm, 2016
Katherine Bradford "By Life & By Land" at Edward Thorp Gallery, video, James Kalm, 2007
Katherine Bradford artist page, CANADA
Katherine Bradford artist page, Adams and Ollman

American women painters
Painters from New York City
20th-century American painters
20th-century American women artists
21st-century American women artists
State University of New York at Purchase alumni
Fashion Institute of Technology faculty
1942 births
Living people
Bradford family
American women academics
21st-century American painters